The 2012 Casino Rama Curling Skins Game on TSN was held on January 7 and 8 at the Casino Rama Entertainment Centre in Rama, Ontario. The total purse for the event was CAD$75,000.

Four teams were invited to participate. The teams each played a semifinal match against another team, and the semifinal winners moved on to the final.

Teams
The 2012 TSN Skins Game sees four world champions playing against each other. Kevin Martin and his rink, the reigning Olympic champions, Alberta provincial champions, and former world champions, will play against Kevin Koe and his rink, former world  and Albertan provincial champions, in the afternoon semifinal. Reigning world and Manitoban provincial champions Jeff Stoughton and team will play against Glenn Howard and his rink, former world champions and reigning Ontario provincial champions, in a rematch of the 2011 Tim Hortons Brier final in the evening semifinal.

Team Howard
Coldwater & District Curling Club, Coldwater, Ontario

Skip: Glenn Howard
Third: Wayne Middaugh
Second: Brent Laing
Lead: Craig Savill

Team Koe
Saville Sports Centre, Edmonton, Alberta

Skip: Kevin Koe
Third: Pat Simmons
Second: Carter Rycroft
Lead: Nolan Thiessen

Team Martin
Saville Sports Centre, Edmonton, Alberta

Skip: Kevin Martin
Third: John Morris
Second: Marc Kennedy
Lead: Ben Hebert

Team Stoughton
Charleswood Curling Club, Winnipeg, Manitoba

Skip: Jeff Stoughton
Third: Jon Mead
Second: Reid Carruthers
Lead: Steve Gould

Results
All times listed in Eastern Standard Time.

Draw to the button challenge
Kevin Martin's team won the draw to the button challenge, which gave them an additional CAD$1,000 winnings.

Martin: 46.1 cm
Koe: 162.4 cm
Stoughton: 220.7 cm
Howard: 260.7 cm

Semifinals

Martin vs. Koe
Saturday, January 7, 1:00 pm

Howard vs. Stoughton
Saturday, January 7, 8:00 pm

Final

Koe vs. Stoughton
Sunday, January 8, 1:00 pm

A CAD$10,000 bonus was awarded to the winner, Kevin Koe.

Final winnings
The final prize winnings for each team are listed below:

Notes

References

External links
Promotional site

TSN Skins Game
Casino Rama Curling Skins Game
Curling in Ontario
2012 in Ontario